Viridiflorol is a chemical compound, classified as a sesquiterpenoid, that has been isolated from the essential oils of a variety of plants including Melaleuca quinquenervia (broad-leaved paperbark), Melaleuca alternifolia (tea tree), and Allophylus edulis.

Viridiflorol has shown moderate antibacterial activity against Mycobacterium tuberculosis, the causative agent of tuberculosis, in an in vitro assay.  It is also produced by the endophytic root fungus Serendipita indica and exhibits antifungal activity against Colletotrichum truncatum

References

Tertiary alcohols